The Cluster of Excellence Unifying Systems in Catalysis (UniSysCat) is an interdisciplinary research network funded by the German Research Foundation (DFG) as part of the federal and state excellence strategy of Germany (Exzellenzstrategie). The funding period runs from January 1, 2019 to December 31, 2025. Around 300 researchers from the Berlin and Potsdam area work in UniSysCat on current issues in catalysis research.
UniSysCat is the follow-up project of the Cluster of Excellence Unifying Concepts in Catalysis (UniCat), which was funded from 2007 to 2018 as part of the federal and state excellence initiative of Germany (Exzellenzinitiative).

Aims 
Catalysis is an active field of research in chemistry. The aim of UniSysCat is to understand coupled catalytic reactions and thus advance catalysis research, particularly with a view to sustainability. One approach of UniSysCat is to learn from nature. Biocatalysts, mostly enzymes, enable biochemical and physiological processes in living beings. Researchers in UniSysCat want to understand the complex, coupled processes that are driven by biocatalysts in nature in order to use the knowledge gained to recreate similar catalytic reaction networks in the laboratory. These catalytic reaction networks should be controllable and used in a targeted manner in order to pave the way to sustainable chemistry based on the example of nature according to the principles of "green chemistry".

Consortium 
 Technische Universität Berlin
 Humboldt Universität zu Berlin
 Freie Universität Berlin
 Universität Potsdam
 Charité - Universitätsmedizin
 Fritz-Haber-Institut der Max-Planck-Gesellschaft
 Max-Planck-Institut for Colloids and Interfaces 
 Helmholtz-Zentrum Berlin
 Leibniz-Forschungsinstitut für Molekulare Pharmakologie
Spokespersons: Holger Dobbek (HU Berlin), Matthias Driess (TU Berlin), Arne Thomas (TU Berlin)

Research 
The research network UniSysCat consists of around 60 research groups with expertise in experimental methods and theoretical approaches in the fields of molecular and structural biology, biochemistry and biophysics, chemical synthesis, physical and theoretical chemistry and physics. UniSysCat's research strategy is based on the previous work of the UniCat Cluster of Excellence (Unifying Concepts in Catalysis).

UniSysCat aims at deciphering reaction networks in chemical and biological catalysis so that they can be controlled and simulated. Which key parameters enable and control chemo- and biocatalytic networks? How can chemical and biological processes be coupled to create catalytic systems with new functions? These are the central research questions of UniSysCat.

Clara Immerwahr Award 
The Clara Immerwahr Award, launched in 2011 by the UniCat Cluster of Excellence, is an award to promote outstanding young women in catalysis research. The award is given annually to a young scientist from Germany or abroad in an early phase of her career (postdoc, young scientist) for excellent performance in catalysis research. It is associated with a financial grant of 15,000 euros for a research stay in a UniSysCat research group and is intended to establish close cooperation with UniSysCat working groups.

The Clara Immerwahr Award is dedicated to Dr. Clara Immerwahr (1870-1915), who was the first women in Germany to receive a doctorate in physical chemistry in 1900.

PhD progam EC2/BIG-NSE 
A structural goal of UniSysCat is the sustainable promotion of young scientists. UniSysCat supports the so-called "EC2/BIG-NSE" doctoral program.

The term EC2/BIG-NSE is made up of the terms EC² (Einstein Center of Catalysis) and BIG-NSE (Berlin International Graduate School of Natural Sciences and Engineering). BIG-NSE was an international PhD program, that dbeen founded on 29. Mai 2007 at the Technical University Berlin, and was part of the Cluster of Excellence UniCat. Since January 1st, 2019, the BIG-NSE doctoral program has been financed by the "Einstein Center of Catalysis" sponsored by the Einstein Foundation Berlin. It followed the renaming to EC2/BIG-NSE. The mission of this doctoral program is to overcome the limits of the classic disciplines in catalysis.

Knowledge transfer 
Catalysis research also plays an important role in industry, especially for sustainable chemistry. Various projects have been established to transfer the research results of UniSysCat to industrial application.

BasCat 
In 2011, the UniCat Cluster of Excellence and the chemical company BASF founded the joint laboratory BasCat at the Technical University of Berlin. BasCat is dedicated to basic research in the field of heterogeneous catalysis. The basic research should then also be transferred to industrial application.

Chemical Invention Factory 
The Chemical Invention Factory (CIF, John Warner Center for Start-ups in Green Chemistry) is a project initiated at the TU Berlin that aims to encourage young scientists to found their own start-ups. The Chemical Invention Factory supports research in the fields of green chemistry, materials, and nanotechnology. In a planned new building there will be state-of-the-art laboratories in which young scientists, accompanied by mentors, can research their own ideas with the aim of developing their results in a start-up until they are ready for the market.

INKULAB  
The INKULAB was a project to promote young entrepreneurs in chemistry. The INKULAB project ended in April 2020 after five years of successful work. During these five years, eight junior teams had the opportunity to work in the laboratories while they were supported by the Center for Entrepreneurship at the Technical University Berlin.

References

External links 

 

Research groups